Nature-deficit disorder is the idea that human beings, especially children, are spending less time outdoors than they have in the past, and the belief that this change results in a wide range of behavioral problems. This disorder is not recognized in any of the medical manuals for mental disorders, such as the ICD-10 or the DSM-5.

Richard Louv claims that causes for nature-deficit disorder include parental fears and restricted access to natural areas.

Elizabeth Dickinson has criticized the term as a misdiagnosis that obscures and problems of dysfunctional cultural practices.

Research
Nature-deficit disorder is unrecognized by most medical institutions. Some preliminary research shows that lack of time outdoors does have negative effects on children's mental well-being.

Causes 
Researchers have not assessed the causes of nature-deficit disorder. However, Richard Louv has proposed some causes:
Parents are keeping children indoors in order to keep them safe from danger. Louv believes that growing parental fear of "stranger danger", heavily fueled by the media, may be the leading cause in nature-deficit disorder, as parents may be protecting children to such an extent that it disrupts the child's ability to connect to nature. 
Dr. Rhonda Clements surveyed 830 mothers, mostly born between 1960 and 1980, and asked about how much time they spent in nature as children; 76% of the mothers said they were outdoors every day Monday-Sunday, but when the same question was asked about their children only 26% said their children spent time outside every day (Clements, 2004). When asked why their children were not enjoying the outdoors as often, the parents said that safety, injury, and fear of crime were the reasons that restricted their children from more outdoor play (Clements, 2004). This research did not, however, address causes of nature-deficit disorder per se, instead focusing solely on changes in outdoor play.
Loss of natural surroundings in a child's neighborhood and city. Many parks and nature preserves have restricted access and "do not walk off the trail" signs. Environmentalists and educators add to the restriction, telling children "look don't touch". While they are protecting the natural environment, Louv questions the cost of that protection on our children's relationship with nature, which profoundly shapes their ecocultural identities.

Effects 

Because nature-deficit disorder is not meant to be a medical diagnosis (and is not recognized as one), researchers have not assessed the effects of nature-deficit disorder.

Louv believes that the effects of nature-deficit disorder on our children will have "profound implications, not only for the health of future generations but for the health of the Earth itself".

Organizations

The Children & Nature Network was created to encourage and support the people and organizations working to reconnect children with nature. Richard Louv is a co-founder of the Children & Nature Network.

The No Child Left Inside Coalition works to get children outside and actively learning. They hope to address the problem of nature-deficit disorder. They are now working on the No Child Left Inside Act, which would increase environmental education in schools. The coalition claims the problem of nature-deficit disorder could be helped by "igniting student's interest in the outdoors" and encouraging them to explore the natural world in their own lives.

In Colombia, OpEPA (Organización para la Educación y Protección Ambiental)  has been working to increase time spent outdoors since 1998. OpEPA's mission is to reconnect children and youth to the Earth so they can act with environmental responsibility. OpEPA works by linking three levels of education: intellectual, experiencial and emotional/spiritual into outdoor experiences. Developing and training educators in the use of inquiry based learning, learning by play and experiential education is a key component to empower educators to engage in nature education.

Critique 
Elizabeth Dickinson, a business communication professor at the University of North Carolina at Chapel Hill, studied nature-deficit disorder through a case study at the North Carolina Educational State Forest system (NCESF), a forest conservation education program. Dickinson argues that it is what Louv's narrative is missing that prevents nature-deficit disorder from effecting meaningful change. She attributes the problems described by nature-deficit disorder as coming not from a lack of children outside or in nature, but from adults' own "psyche and dysfunctional cultural practices". According to Dickinson, "in the absence of deeper cultural examination and alternative practices, nature deficit disorder is a misdiagnosis—a problematic contemporary environmental discourse that can obscure and mistreat the problem."

Dickinson analyzed the language and discourses used at the NCESF (educators' messages, education and curriculum materials, forest service messages and literature, and the forests themselves) and compared them to Louv's discussion of nature-deficit disorder in his writings. She concluded that both Louv and the NCESF (both who loosely support each other) perpetuate the problematic idea that humans are outside of nature, and they use techniques that appear to get children more connected to nature but that may not.

She suggests making it clear that modern culture's disassociation with nature has occurred gradually over time, rather than very recently. Dickinson thinks that many people idealize their own childhoods without seeing the dysfunction that has existed for multiple generations. She warns against viewing the cure to nature-deficit disorder as an outward entity: "nature". Instead, Dickinson states that a path of inward self-assessment "with nature" (rather than "in nature") and alongside meaningful time spent in nature is the key to solving the social and environmental problems of which nature-deficit disorder is a symptom. In addition, she advocates allowing nature education to take on an emotional pedagogy rather than a mainly scientific one, as well as experiencing nature as it is before ascribing names to everything.

See also 
 Biophilia hypothesis
 Ecopsychology
 Environmental psychology
 Plant blindness
 Wilderness therapy

References

Further reading
Louv, Richard. (2011) The Nature Principle: Human Restoration and the End of Nature-Deficit Disorder. Algonquin Books. 303pp.
Louv, Richard.  (2005)  Last Child in the Woods: Saving Our Children from Nature-Deficit Disorder (Paperback edition).  Algonquin Books.  335pp.
Louv, Richard, Web of Life: Weaving the Values That Sustain Us.

External links
Richard Louv's website
Children & Nature Network
An interview with Richard Louv about the need to get kids out into nature, by David Roberts, The Grist: Environmental News and Commentary, 30 Mar 2006.
Saving kids from nature-deficit disorder - May 25, 2005, NPR
Public School Insights' Interview with Richard Louv - April 22, 2008
Chicago Wilderness Leave No Child Inside Initiative
Planet Ark's Research Report on Children & Nature in Australia
Nature Play: Nurturing Children and Strengthening Conservation through Connections to the Land

Natural environment
Developmental psychology
Environmental psychology
Outdoor education
Childhood
Biophilia hypothesis